Naharlagun railway station is a railway station located in Papum Pare district of Arunachal Pradesh.

History

Railway's goal of providing connectivity to all state capitals of the northeastern region, a survey was conducted in 1997 for a new line from Harmuti to Itanagar and the project was sanctioned in 1996–97 Railway Budget as a metre-gauge line.
The approval of the state government was received in 2006, but the alignment had to be changed in 2010 on the request of the state government and finally the line was taken up as a broad-gauge line from Harmuti to Naharlagun.

Opened
The engine trial run was completed on 15 October 2012, but the railway station was only opened on 7 April 2014. On the same day a Naharlagun–Dekargaon Passenger was inaugurated.
The station has three platforms. Many trains are running from Naharlagun Station at present.

Major Trains

Trains originating/halting at Naharlagun are as follows:

 Naharlagun–Guwahati Donyi Polo Express
 22411/Naharlagun–Anand Vihar Terminal Arunachal AC SF Express,
 Naharlagun−Guwahati Shatabdi Express
 15908/ Naharlagun–Tinsukia Intercity Express
 Naharlagun – Dekargaon Passenger

References

Rangiya railway division
Railway stations in India opened in 2014
2014 establishments in Arunachal Pradesh
Railway stations in Papum Pare district
Transport in Itanagar